Booué is a small town in central Gabon. It is situated in Lopé Department, southwest side of the Ogooué-Ivindo Province. The town lies just 6.6 miles to the south of the Equator and is the province's only Department capital in the Southern Hemisphere.

History
Booué is a bad transcription and a francization effort of the word "Mbue" or "Mboue" from the Shiwe language erroneously attributed to a town located in Ogooué-Ivindo province, Gabon by Pierre Savorgnan de Brazza in 1878. Booué is still referred to as "Mboue" by the Shiwe people who were the first settlers of this town and who named it Nangashiki, but was changed to Mboue and subsequently to Booué. From all historical accounts, this change resulted from a miscommunication between De Brazza and Mpami Nani Shui, a Shiwe Chief, during some negotiation talks between the two men. Many accounts from the Shiwe people indicate that while negotiating his passage to the upper Ogooué River, De Brazza asked Mpami Nani Shui the name of his village. Thinking that De Brazza was actually asking the name of an aquatic plant floating on the Ogooué River, he answered "Mboung" as the Shiwe people called it. De Brazza, thinking that he had been told the actual name of the village, wrote and recorded it as "Mboue", then Booué later on. Thus Mboue, as a village and later a town, was founded by the Shiwe people originating from the southeast of Cameroon between the eighteenth and nineteenth centuries; but the name Mboue itself and later its transcription "Booué" was mistakenly attributed to the village and later to the town by De Brazza. 
During the French colonization, Mboue was the capital city of the then Ogooué-Ivindo region until 1953. Today, it is just one of the four Department capital cities of the Ogooué-Ivindo Province.

Transport
Visitors from other parts of Gabon and from overseas use generally the TRANSGABONAIS trains to get to Booué. It is perhaps the cheapest and safest way to travel to Booué, but it also can be very tiring and time-consuming. Booué does have an airfield; but it may not be very practical because it is not tarred. In addition, air tickets may be very expensive since there is no regular airline serving this town. Visitors from other cities in the Ogooué-Ivindo province generally use rented mini buses, cars, and trucks to travel to Booué. Once in Booué, there are some local cabs to get around. If one is interested in crossing the Ogooué River for an adventure in the bush, a ferry is available at no cost; but you will need a car for the ferry to make the trip!

See also
Railway stations in Gabon

References

Populated places in Ogooué-Ivindo Province